A list of notable buildings and structures in Guinea-Bissau:

Bissau

Education and culture
Guinea-Bissau National Ethnographic Museum
Universidade Amílcar Cabral
Universidade Colinas de Boé

Hotels
Hotel Hotti Bissau

Palaces, forts and memorials
Fortaleza de São José da Amura
Presidential Palace, Bissau

Places of worship
Bissau Cathedral
Igreja Universal do Reino de Deus

Transport
Osvaldo Vieira International Airport
Port of Bissau

Other
Hospital Nacional Simão Mendes
Estadio Lino Correia

Bafatá
Bafatá Airport